Stephen Gilbert (1910–2007) was a British painter and sculptor.

Steve or Stephen Gilbert may also refer to:

 Stephen Gilbert (novelist) (1912–2010), Northern Irish novelist
 Stephen Gilbert, Baron Gilbert of Panteg (born 1963), Conservative member of the British House of Lords
 Steve Gilbert (born 1976), British politician
 Steve Gilbert (American football), head football coach at Jacksonville University